Bengt Edvin Åberg (26 June 1944 – 6 March 2021) was a Swedish professional motocross racer. He competed in the Motocross World Championships from 1966 to 1979. He was a two-time FIM 500cc Motocross World Champion.

Biography
Åberg was born in Gävleborg County, Sweden. He was one of the top riders in the Motocross Grand Prix World Championships during the late 1960s and early 1970s. In 1968 he was part of the Swedish team that won the Trophée des Nations. He won the FIM 500cc Motocross World Championship in 1969 and 1970 while riding for the Husqvarna factory racing team. Åberg was a member of three victorious Swedish teams at the Motocross des Nations in 1970, 1971, and 1974. In 1974, 1975 and 1976, he rode for the Bultaco factory in the 500cc class.

In 1977 he competed on a highly modified four stroke Yamaha XT500 built in collaboration with former world champions Torsten Hallman and Sten Lundin. Åberg rode the bike to a victory in the first moto of the 1977 500cc Luxembourg Grand Prix and ended the season ranked 9th in the final world championship standings.

In 1995, he won the Swedish ice speedway national championships. He was a longtime member of the Bollnäs Motorklubb, serving on the board and helping design local motocross tracks.

References 

1944 births
2021 deaths
People from Ovanåker Municipality
People from Bollnäs
Swedish motocross riders
Sportspeople from Gävleborg County